Trent Opaloch is a Canadian cinematographer best known for his work with directors Neill Blomkamp and the Russo brothers. His major works include District 9 (2009), Elysium (2013), Captain America: The Winter Soldier (2014), Chappie (2015), Captain America: Civil War (2016), Avengers: Infinity War (2018) and Avengers: Endgame (2019). In 2010, Opaloch was nominated for the BAFTA Award for Best Cinematography for his work on District 9. In 2020, Opaloch starred in the music video for Pearl Jam's single "Retrograde".

Biography
Opaloch grew up in Thunder Bay, Ontario. He studied filmmaking at Confederation College, before moving to Vancouver to start his professional career.

Filmography

References

External links 
 
 

Canadian cinematographers
Living people
People from Thunder Bay
Year of birth missing (living people)